Ladette Randolph is an American author and editor.

Ladette Randolph is the author of five books: three novels: Private Way, Haven’s Wake and A Sandhills Ballad, a short story collection, This is Not the Tropics, and a memoir, Leaving the Pink House. She is the editor-in-chief of the literary journal Ploughshares at Emerson College and co-owner of the manuscript consulting firm Randolph Lundine. A long-time Nebraskan, she spent her childhood in the same part of west-central Nebraska where her family lived for five generations. She now lives in Boston with her husband Noel.

Awards
Ladette Randolph is the recipient of four Nebraska Book Awards, a Rona Jaffe grant, a Pushcart Prize, a Virginia Faulkner award, and a citation from Best New American Voices.

Works
 Private Way. University of Nebraska Press. 2022. ISBN 978-1-4962-3119-2
 
 
 Sandhill Ballad. University of Nebraska Press. 2009. ISBN 978-0-8263-4685-8.

Editor

References

External links 
 Official website

Living people
American women writers
Emerson College faculty
Rona Jaffe Foundation Writers' Award winners
Year of birth missing (living people)
American women academics
21st-century American women